Douglas Everett Sparks (born January 8, 1956) is an American Episcopal bishop. He is the eighth and current bishop of Northern Indiana in The Episcopal Church.

Ordained ministry

Roman Catholic Church
Sparks studied Philosophy at St. Mary's Seminary College, graduating with a Bachelor of Arts (BA) degree in May 1980. He attended the De Andreis Institute of Theology, from which he graduated with a Master of Divinity (M.Div.) degree in June 1984.

Sparks was ordained in the Roman Catholic Church as a deacon in April 1983 and to the priesthood in June 1984. He then served as a priest in Missouri, Colorado, and Illinois.

Episcopal Church
On June 4, 1989, Sparks was received as a priest into the Episcopal Church. Sparks served as Rector of St. Luke's Episcopal Church in Whitewater, Wisconsin from 1990 to 1995.

After a further incumbency at St Matthias in Waukesha, Wisconsin, he spent eighteen months serving as Dean of Saint Paul's Cathedral, Wellington, New Zealand. Upon his return he became Rector of St. Luke's Episcopal Church in Rochester, Minnesota.

On February 6, 2016, Sparks was elected as the next bishop of the Episcopal Diocese of Northern Indiana. On June 25, 2016, the Nativity of Saint John the Baptist, he was consecrated a bishop by Michael Curry.

Personal life
Sparks is married to Dana Wirth Sparks; the couple has three children Christina, Graham, and Gavin.

See also
 List of Episcopal bishops of the United States
 Historical list of the Episcopal bishops of the United States

References

1956 births
Place of birth missing (living people)
Converts to Anglicanism from Roman Catholicism
Deans of Wellington
Living people
Episcopal bishops of Northern Indiana